Arda River may refer to:

 Arda (Italy), a river in Italy
 Arda (Maritsa), a river in Bulgaria
 Arda River (Douro tributary), a river in Portugal

See also
 Arda (disambiguation)
 Ada (disambiguation)
 Adda River (disambiguation)